is Toei Company's twenty-ninth production of the Super Sentai metaseries. It aired from February 13, 2005, to February 12, 2006, replacing Tokusou Sentai Dekaranger and was replaced by GoGo Sentai Boukenger. The action footage was used in Power Rangers Mystic Force and both shows had scenes simultaneously shot in New Zealand. The main themes of this series are courage and love of family. This series was dubbed into Korean under the title Power Rangers Magic Force. TV Asahi's Super Hero Time alongside Kamen Rider Hibiki.

The catchphrases of the series are "Magic, it's a sacred power! Magic, it's an adventure to the unknown! Magic,  and it's a proof of courage!" and "Divine! Adventurous! Courageous! It's just MAGIC".

Synopsis
A war between the Infershia and Magitopia had occurred unbeknownst to humans. After being imprisoned within the Earth for fifteen years, the Infershia have returned to get revenge from their imprisonment. When the Infershia attack, five siblings witness their mother change in front of them and she hands them Magi Phones to transform into a magic team. Now endowed with magic powers, these five vow to live up to their family's legacy. They have yet to discover many more family secrets.

Characters

Magirangers
The  is a family of mages that initially consisted of five children (three brothers and two sisters) who lived peacefully with their mother Miyuki on the assumption that their father died in an expedition in Antarctica. But the five learn their family legacy as they battle against the Infershia after their mother was taken from them, reunited with their parents by the series finale.

  The youngest of the Ozu Family who is team leader despite being in high school, impulsive yet optimistic and brave. Kai bore animosity towards Wolzard for apparently killing Miyuki for most of the series before learning his true identity as Isamu, gradually accepting him while inheriting his techniques and ideals. In the series finale epilogue, Kai becomes a liaison between the "Surface World" and Infershia.
  The middle son of the Ozu Family, the rational second in command despite being laid-back and irresponsible at times. Following the final battle against N Ma, Tsubasa becomes a professional boxer. As Magi Yellow, able to turn his Magi Stick into a crossbow, he is able to transform into the Majin , which forms the wings of Magi Dragon and Magi King.
  The youngest daughter and middle child of the Ozu Family, a kind-hearted yet strict girl who acts like a surrogate mother to her siblings. Urara also had a frog phobia due to a prank Kai pulled on them when they were little, which partially overcame to restore Hikaru whom she eventually fell in love with and married prior to the final battle. As Magi Blue, she is able to transform into the Majin , while her  form allows her to serve as a component in forming Magi Lion.
  The eldest daughter and the second oldest child of the Ozu Family, a somewhat ditzy girl who looks on the bright side of things while sometimes working a fashion model. She was previously turned in a vampire servant by Vancuria before Tsubasa restored her to normal and later convinced Titan to abandon Infershia.
  The eldest son of the Ozu Family, who is a father figure to his younger siblings and grows vegetables on his personal "Aniki Farm". He despite being appearing to overbearing, he is truly the linchpin that keeps his family together. As Magi Green, able to turn his Magi Stick into an axe, he is able to transform into the Majin , which forms the main body of Magi Dragon and Magi King. After gaining the ability to become , he is able to combine with his three younger siblings to form Magi Lion.
Assuming his human identity, Hikaru resolves to serve as the Ozu siblings as their mentor in magic while settling things with Memmy. Overtime, while ending up learning from them, Hikaru began to develop feelings for Urara and eventually married her prior to the series finale.
Following Isamu's disappearance, convincing Magiel to grant her children magic as a precaution, Miyuki concealed the truth of her and her husband fighting Infershia from their children until its forces resume their attack on the surface. Through it appeared Wolzard killed her with the Magirangers motivated to fight Infershia, he momentary regained his memory as Isamu long enough to teleport her away into the Flower Garden of Souls as light. But Miyuki is taken captive by Toad before her children rescue her.
He can enlarge himself to combine with his steed  into either  via  or  via Majin Fusion. Wolzard battled the Magirangers until he regained his memories and sacrificed himself to seal N Ma into his body, hiding himself away until he was attacked and nearly killed by Dagon.

Allies
  A young mandrake the Magirangers met when they found their secret headquarters. Despite being in a pot, he can hop around as well as fly. He can even be plucked out of the pot, which, true to his species, will cause him to emit a deafening cry, though the experience comes to him as painful (as seen in Stage 3, when Tsubasa, with headphones on, did so). Mandora Boy will often give advice to the team, particularly Kai, and introduced their individual abilities to them. He is very emotional and easily excited and tends to bicker with Smoky after he and Hikaru moved in.
  Hikaru's mischievous feline genie who resides in the Magi Lamp, which was found in the cave that was Raigel's tomb. Smoky came into being from the volcano in Flagel's domain on Magitopia, causing trouble for the Magitopians with his pranks until he was inflicted with a curse from opening the Annihilation Box. Sungel saved Smoky by placing him in the Magi Lamp, but the cat is informed that he can't last more than three hours outside the lamp. Smoky can be released from the curse if he grants the wishes of others, but Smoky prefers to grant only one wish to whoever awakens him from his slumber, and only if he is compensated for his services. When the Ozu siblings wished for Infershia to be gone, he denied their request, stating that the power the Infershia wield is greater than his own. He seems to have some limited magical powers as well, such as getting brief glimpses of the future and enlarging himself to help the gang out and by turning food into sand as a prank. Despite being a goof-off, he is a capable fighter and once piloted Travelion (though he usually just shovels the coal). He sees Urara as a mother figures and bickers with Mandora Boy now and then.
  The manager of Kai's high school soccer team whom he developed a strong crush on despite her falling in love with Magi Red. But Yuka learns of Kai's identity as Magi Red during the events of Bride of Infershia, when abducted by Glúm do Bridon to be his bride. She kept this from Kai as she supports him from afar. 
  The first Heavenly Saint the Magirangers encounter, an ally of Blagel who acted on his orders to seal Hades Gate with "key magic", keeping it close while she lives. But Lunagel loses her memory after being attacked by Raigel, wandering in a human form that Kai later named  before she regaining her memories. Despite her initial thoughts on the Magirangers, she reconsiders after Kai saves her as she returns to Magitopia while helping the Ozu siblings in any way she can. 
  The Heavenly Saint Miyuki derives her power from and former apprentice of the Five Legendary Magicians' pupil, able to unleash one's dormant magic with a person and assume an infant-like guise. But after the tragedy of Miyuki and Blagel along with Raigel's treachery, Snowgel took refuge in the Marudeyona World called the "Lamentation Sea" formed from her tears. The Magirangers manage to find Snowgel and convince her to aid them acquiring the Legend power. Snowgel later appears to aid in Magirangers' battle against Drake, revealing her true adult form while giving Hikaru an important lesson. 
  The giant-sized leader of the Heavenly Saints who resides in Heavenly Temple, the highest point in Magitopia. At first, she refused to let the Ozu siblings borrow Unigolon due to the fact that Magitopian law dictates that Heavenly Saints are not allowed to intervene in human affairs. Magiel even admitted she frowned on both Blagel's choice to sacrifice himself and Miyuki's intent to learn magic. But after seeing the same courage their parents showed, Magiel allowed them Unigolon's aid and made a later exception on the distribution of the Legendary Magicians' power to the Ozu siblings. When N Ma attacks Magitopia, after failing to stop him, Magiel teleports Lunagel to the human world while seemingly killed by the demon's rampage. But Magiel teleported herself to the Flower Garden of Souls at the last second and remained there during the final battle. A year after N Ma's destruction, Magiel is still getting used to Urara living on the rebuilt Magitopia.

Infershia
The  are an underground empire which was ruled by the mysterious N Ma. Fifteen years ago, N Ma created the Hades Gate to send his entire army to Earth, but was stopped by the Heavenly Saint Blagel. N Ma uses his agents to break the seal so he can conquer the surface world. However, over time, some of the Infershians began to realize N Ma's insane obsession of destroying Magitopia and the Ozu Family was reckless due to needless deaths. Once N Ma was destroyed, Hades Goddess Sphinx took over the Infershia to rebuild their world and start anew with Magitopia.

  The ruler of Infershia and the main antagonist of the series, a Cthulhu-themed demon of pure evil motivated by sheer malice and an uncontrollable hunger to devour everything in sight. His original form is a giant-sized octopus with dragon-headed tentacles. For the first half of the series, N Ma contacted his minions via a white pool at the center of their lair before a purified Blagel sealed the demon's soul in his own body. But Hades Gods extracted N Ma with Titan sacrificed to enable N Ma molding the god's body in his image. Three days after acquiring his new form, N Ma attacks Magitopia while revealing his ability to absorb all magic. The Magirangers ultimate use the ability against him to cause him to explode from being unable to contain their unlimited magic.
  The Frankenstein's monster-themed high commander who was previously a High Zobil, armed with the Imperial Sword Hell Fang created from N Ma's fang that he uses in his "Hell Slash" attack. Branken desires to reach the surface world and clashed with Wolzard over it, using the Hades Beasts to systematic slaughter people in hopes one among would be Lungel with her death removing the seal on the Hades Gate. Once Lunagel was found and captured, Branken forced himself through the partially unseal Hades Gate before he is destroyed by Magi King with Wolzard taking his Hell Fang to forge into a replacement sword.
  The mummy-themed high commander who took over following Branken, armed with an extendable fan. He was originally , Glagel's apprentice who believed magic is a means to grant his own selfish desires. He betrayed his comrades during their battle with Infershia, abandoning Blagel and sealing Lunagel's memories before confronted by Sungel in a battle that ended with them sealed in a cave with Raigel's mummified remains covered by Vancuria. Meemy, seeing himself as N Ma's vassel, uses the Hades Beastmen in schemes to bring N Ma into the human world before succeeding with the Magirangers' Legend powers. But he is killed after engaging Hikaru in Duel Bond match, crumbling to dust while revealing the advent of the Infershia Pantheon.
  A vampire queen who serves Infershia's spy, adversely unaffected by sunlight and virtually indestructible. She acquired to the ability to travel freely between the surface and Infershia when she developed the ability to split herself into two bodies to over her lonely existence. The two fragmented halves, are mischievous in personality with Nai appearing 'older sister' since Mea repeats some of words. Eventually, Vancuria joins Sphinx in siding with the Magirangers to stop N Ma.

Infershia Pantheon
The  are the antagonist of the second half of the series, composed of ten giant-sized deities residing in the  until they were revived upon N Ma's death to deliver  on mankind with any interference having grave consequences for both the surface world and Magitopia. The reason for this is because the Hades gods' deaths serve an alternate purpose to provide N Ma with selecting a vessel among the survivors. Should they choose to play games with anyone, they must abide by the rules they made.

  One of the Three Wise Gods and leader of the Infershia Pantheon, armed with Samukama trident and religiously devoted with N Ma. When he realizes that something's array with the Dark Percepts, Dagon learns that Wolzard is keeping N Ma's soul prisoner within his body. This forces Dagon to break the rules to lure Wolzard out by targeting his children whom he could no longer underestimated, sending Sleipnir to support Drake to force Wolzard to act. After Vancuria planted one of his fishscales on Wolzard during the battle, Dagon takes Wyvern and Titan with him to ambush Wolzard and knock him down a fiery crevasse after extracting N Ma's soul. After killing Titan so that N Ma could be reborn and then Sphinx when she abandoned her Divine Punishment, Dagon abducts Magi Mother after killing Smoky with an attack meant for Urara. But Dagon is shocked to find Sphinx revived by Vancuria, killed by the former after she attempted to give him a chance to change his ways.
  One of the Three Wise Gods who enforces the Dark Percepts while serving as an observer, with armed with the Lionic Blade bazooka-gauntlet. Noticing Dagon's disregard for their rules and their members being defeated, Sphinx decides to use Makito, Houka, and Titan's escape to the Eternal Woods to interrogate the other Magirangers over how they defeated the other gods in her Marudeyouna world Sage's Night on the promise of sending them to Titan's location, amazed to hear their answer to be courage. Following N Ma's resurrection, despite attempting to convince the others that the Surface World has some worth they could learn from, Sphinx is forced to attack as the last god chosen by the Slab of Judgement. Though Sphinx overpowered the Magirangers, she renounced her Divine Punishment after being convinced by Urara with Sleipnir and Dagon killing her off on N Ma's orders. But Sphinx is revived by Vancuria, saving Miyuki from Dagon while being forced to kill him. After N Ma's defeat, Sphinx become the new leader of the Infershia and establishes an alliance between her kind and Magitopia while over seeing Infershia's reconstruction.
  One of the Five Warrior Gods, armed a club with a ball and chain as his weapon and able to evaporate any attacks within his sight. The first chosen by the Slab of Judgement, Ifrit toyed with the humans by lighting a tower on fire to give the humans time to repent and beg for their lives before commencing to reduce everything to ashes. But while fighting Magi Legend, Ifrit lit another tower as he proclaimed he would kill the Magirangers before it completely burns while promising to reveal their mother's whereabouts. But Ifrit prolonged his fight after the tower completely burned and is killed by Dagon to maintain the Dark Precept, Ifrit revealing Miyuki is held captive by one of other Hades gods in "a garden of thorns".
  One of the Five Warrior Gods, a robotic sharpshooter armed with sniper rifle-type bayonet that uses different ammunitions to has different effects. He is also one of the most calm and composed of the group, reclaiming composure quickly even if he were to get angry. The second chosen by the Slab of Judgement, using reflective surfaces to snipe them, Cyclops challenges the Magirangers with a game of cat and mouse where at least one of them needs evade his shots until sunset for the group to win. But Tsubasa manages to outwit Cyclops and defeat him to save his siblings, with Cyclops destroyed by Magi Legend with assistance from Travelion.
  One of the Three Wise Gods whose personal Marudeyouna world is "Gorgon's Garden", armed with an aegis-type mirror-shield and able to turn herself into either a Nāga-like form or a giant snake to devour her enemies. Learning herself to be the third chosen by the Slab of Judgement from reading the Book of Prophecy, intending to turn people to stone through her snake familiars and mirror-shield, Gorgon sends Toad out to alter events for her benefit by having him body swap Kai and Houka. But Sphinx restores Kai and Houka when Gorgon attacks them once dealing with the others, her falling apart as she dies proclaiming Drake would avenge her.
  One of the Two Ultimate Gods, representing Infershia's shield due to his impenetrable hide that covers his entire body except the back of his neck. Drake is armed with a sword that can shoot streams of lightning and his hide allows him to survive any kind of attack unscathed. Having to respect for his group's ritual practices, Drake's only motivation is destroying everything on the surface and fight Hikaru. Following Gorgon's death, Drake is the fourth to be chosen by the Slab of Judgement as he assumes a dragon-like form to destroy the city before Hikaru learns of Drake's weakpoint and defeats him. Drake then joined by Sleipnir as the two overpower Magi Legend and Travelion before Wolzard removes the latter from the fight, with Drake destroyed soon after.
  One of the Five Warrior Gods, armed with a trumpet-hammer and able to use a variety of poisons produced from his warts. He is also a glutton who feeds on High Zobils and collects souls, unintentionally capturing Miyuki during his post-awakening visit to the Flower Garden of Souls and holding her with his Briar Garden. Initially used by Gorgon to body-swap Kai and Houka, Toad is the fifth god chosen by the Slab of Judgement as he conjures forth huge clouds of Hades Frog Eggs in the sky to subject the world to a Plague of Frogs. But the Magirangers eventually defeat him alongside Magi Mother.
 The strongest of the Five Warrior Gods, armed a double bladed staff, Titan abhorred the ideas of needless suffering and pointless fighting. After accompanying Dagon and Wyvern to seek out Wolzard to reclaim N Ma's soul, Titan is the sixth god chosen by the Slab of Judgement as gathers electricity to create a large ball of energy to instantly kill everyone before Houka convinces him to renounce his Divine Punishment once seeing him for the kind-hearted figure he is. Titan then forced to flee after being chosen as N Ma's vessel, which required him to sacrifice himself so the deity fully resurrect. Despite Houka, and Makito taking him to the Marudeyouna world known as the Eternal Woods where he can enter a deep rest in the Lake of Slumber, Titan is killed by Dagon with N Ma hatching, ripping and melting out of the god's dying body.
  One of the Five Warrior Gods, fast and arrogant while armed with a spear. He initially takes a liking in Vancuria, helping her understand his group and how their function. But after Wolzard injured him while retrieving N Ma's soul, Wvyern became bitter enough to lash out at Nai and Mea whenever they come to his aid or comfort him. When Titan flees to the Eternal Woods, Wyvern pursues him before learning that Makito and Houka distracted him with the latter's disguise magic to give Titan time to reach at the Lake of Slumber. This causes an infuriated Wyvern to overpower the Magirangers until Isamu showed up and absorbed one of the revenge-driven deity's flames, with Wyvern destroyed by Wolzard Fire after an incredibly short standoff.
  One of the two Ultimate Gods and Dagon's right-hand, a black knight-like demon who represents Infershia's halberd who boasts of being having the greatest offence among the gods. He is armed with jousting lance or a jagged sword and a shield, with signature attack being his Ranging Spear Crusher thrust attack. Easily defeating Magi Legend with a single blow when the Hades gods first appeared, Dagon sends him to aid Drake in overpowering the Magirangers on his Hades Chariot pulled by Barikion-like horses before Wol Kaiser removes him from the fight. After aiding Dagon in executing Sphinx, Sleipnir takes over her Divine Punishment while fighting the Magirangers before they managed to destroy him with their Five Fantastic Aerial Attack.

Hades Beasts

The  are he first wave of monsters to fight the Magirangers, send by Branken to kill humans in hopes that one of their victims is Lunagel, whose death would open the gate. The first three were naturally giant, but the rest were human-sized when first depicted. When these human-sized Hades Beasts are killed, Wolzard used a spell that resurrects the monsters and makes them grow. They emerged onto the surface through a dark magic circle.

  A large troll who was defeated by Miyuki Ozu.
  A large slimy monster.
  A giant eight-headed worm.
  A cockatrice-themed Hades Beast with dragon head-shaped wings who can turn people to stone.
  An insectoid Hades Beast who can take the form of a taxi cab.
  A mushroom-themed Hades Beast.
  A mandrill-faced Manticore-themed Hades Beast with a shaman personality.
  A troll resembling the previous troll except for the fact that it wears different clothing.
  A Hades Beast that was released from its jar by a High Zobil.
  A Hades Beast that assisted Nai and Mia in turning people into vampires.
  A Hades Beast that resided on top of the Hades Gate until it was awakened to release Bracken.
  A spider-themed Hades Beast that works for Belbireji

Three Solitary Confinement Hades Beasts
The  are three imprisoned Hades Beast that were released by Vancuria and can travel to the surface on their own.

  A Hades Beast who wields a club.
  A hyena-themed Hades Beast who wields boxing gloves.
  A skeleton-themed Hades Beast who is the strongest of the group. He wields a staff in battle.

Hades Beastmen

The  are the second wave of monsters to fight the Magirangers, previous humans who sold their souls to N Ma, and were more powerful and intelligent than ordinary Hades Beasts. They had been sealed away by Blagel but were set free by Meemy, bond to serve him as commanded by the Dark Contract to sacrifice many humans so that N Ma could be revived.

  A mischievous Hades Beastman.
  A hammer-wielding Hades Beastman.
  A ninja-themed Hades Beastman.
  A Hades Beastman that once dated Vancuria.
  A Hades Beastman.
  A female Hades Beastman who can induce hunger pangs into anyone with her shrieks.
As Infershian legends say, should the king of the Hades Beastman Berserkers and a pure-hearted human girl marry, all the spirits trapped in the armor would be resurrected into the world. Glúm kidnapped Yuka Yamazaki to be his bride to bring his army of Hades Beastman Berserkers into the world. He used the Puppet's Ring that absorbed the souls of humans to put Yuka under his control and make her love him. He wore a helmet that concealed his hideous face. As the type of Hades Beastman he is, once he becomes enraged, spikes shoot out from his armor, even from his face plate and his strength and defense doubles. During the wedding, he wore a cape. He wielded a glaive that could also turn into a sword or gun. His marriage would have been successful, if Kai hadn't intervened. He was consumed by his  to become the scorpion/centaur  before being destroyed by Saint Kaiser, with Magi Dragon and Travelion's aid.
  The antagonist of Magiranger vs. Dekaranger, his real name is  who leave Earth years ago and became an apprentice and successor to Agent Abrella with the Alienizer Babon as his partner in crime in a scheme to acquire the Flower of Heaven to destroy all love on the planet. But after being wounded by Legend Magi Red and the Deka Red Battlizer, Agent X is destroyed when the Magirangers and the Dekarangers hit him and Babon with their Fantastic Strike Out attack.

Hades Beastmen Elite Four
The  are the most evil and powerful of the Hades Beastmen who overpowered Blagel before they were sealed away. They were summoned by Meemy in an attempt to placate N Ma.

  The first of the Hades Beastman Elite Four to attack the Magirangers. He is actually a living sword that possess the holder and can severe the bonds between people after it's body was destroyed. The sword was later destroyed by the Magirangers
  The group's female leader who uses the ghost of Rei to gather souls to defeat her throat which Blagel injured years ago.
  The group's hockey-themed leader who injured Blagel enough to be turned into Wolzard, enlists the aid of Hades Beastman Kobold Bullrates to freeze the world with his "Devil's Glacier" plan before being destroyed by the Legend MagiRangers.
  A 300-year-old Elite Hades Beastman who assisted Hades Beastman Yeti Zee in freezing the world. Bullrates end up the group's last member as he is tricked by Memmy into having his soul used to animate Hades Machine Golem.

Other Infershia monsters
The following monsters do not fit in the categories above:

  An ancient Machine Hades Beast residing in Infershia's Marudeyouna. Meemy sacrificed Kobold Bullrates so that he can use his soul to power the Hades Machine Golem. It was destroyed by the Magi Legend.
  An orb-shaped fungus summoned by Meemy that feeds off of living organisms.
  Meemy used a forbidden spell in the Lost Graveyard of Hatred to fuse the souls of the Hades Beasts and Hades Beastmen with the stolen Travelion energies in order to create Chimera. It sports a vampire-like head with a vampire bat face on top of its head, the sentient head of a chameleon woman on its right shoulder, the sentient head of a bull on its right shoulder, a lobster-like face on its neck, a lion-like head on its chest where a human skull is in its mouth, a European dragon head instead of a right arm, the left arm of Hades Beast Troll where it sports claws on its fingers, and the slimmed down legs and feet of Hades Beast Cockatrice minus a toe on each feet.

Grunts
  Zombie-like soldiers who wield axes and follow the High Zobil. There are thousands of them in the lair. Underneath their helmets are their repulsive rotting skulls with maggots. In the finale, they are shown with builder hats building the bridge that links the surface world to Infershia.
  Higher-ranked Zobils who wield either large spear-like staffs or whips and leads the Zobils into battle as a field commander. They can also control some of the Hades Beasts. While they first appeared in Stage 1, they first fought the Rangers in Stage 3, where the one they fought against and was beaten by the Rangers was killed by Branken as punishment for incompetence. Branken was originally a High Zobil himself. Toad occasionally ate High Zobil from a bowl.

Magical spells
The characters of Magiranger use magical spells to accomplish tasks. Each magical word correspond to a digit on a phone. For example, when the Magiranger wants to transform into their Magiranger forms, they use 106, which corresponds to "Maagi Magi Magiiro" and "Goolu Golu Goludiro".

Stages (Episodes)

Production
The Mahō Sentai trademark was registered by Toei on May 31, 2004, around 4-month before of trademark for the Magiranger's team name, The Magiranger trademark was registered on September 22, 2004.

Theatrical movie and direct-to-video releases
: A 2005 film that takes place between Stages 25 and 26.
: A 2006 V-Cinema release that takes place between Stages 31 and 32.
: A 2005 special DVD.
: A 2007 V-Cinema release that takes place between Episodes 42 and 43 of GoGo Sentai Boukenger.

Cast
Kai Ozu: 
Tsubasa Ozu: 
Urara Ozu: 
Houka Ozu: 
Makito Ozu: 
Hikaru: 
Miyuki Ozu, Goddess of the Spring (Special DVD): 
Isamu Ozu: 
Yuka Yamazaki: 
: 
: 
Nai: 
Mea: 
Rin: 
Magiel:

Voice actors
Mandora Boy, announcer (calls each episode's title): 
Smoky: 
Snowgel: 
Hades Beast Emperor N Ma: 
Absolute God N Ma: 
Branken: 
Vancuria: 
Meemy, Raigel: 
Sleipnir: 
Drake: 
Dagon: 
Sphinx: 
Gorgon: 
Titan: 
Wyvern: 
Toad: 
Cyclops: 
Ifrit: 
Zobil, High Zobil: Katsumi Shiono, 
Narrator, Spell Voice:

Songs
Opening theme

Lyrics: Yūho Iwasato
Composition: Takafumi Iwasaki
Arrangement: Seiichi Kyōda
Artist: 

Ending theme

Lyrics: Yūho Iwasato
Composition: YOFFY
Arrangement: Psychic Lover & Kenichirō Ōishi
Artist: Sister MAYO

International Broadcasts and Home Video
This series was limited to only airing in other Asian regions, as most around the world have aired the Power Rangers adaptation, Power Rangers Mystic Force instead. With the exception of its' home country of Japan, which has also broadcast a Japanese dub of the Power Rangers adaptation in 2012. 
In South Korea, the series was dubbed in Korean and aired in 2006 as Power Rangers Magic Force (파워레인저 매직포스) and aired on several channels (JEI TV, Champ TV, Any One, Aniobox).
In the Chinese-speaking world, Both Mandarin (Taiwan dialect) and Cantonese dubs were produced and aired in Taiwan and Hong Kong respectively.
In Taiwan, the series aired with a Taiwanese Mandarin dub on September 30, 2007, until August 31, 2008, with all episodes dubbed, airing on GTV.
In Hong Kong, the series aired with a Cantonese Chinese dub on March 9, 2008 (a few months after Taiwan aired the Taiwanese Mandarin dub) on TVB Jade until March 8, 2009, with all episodes dubbed.
In Thailand, the series was licensed by Rose Media Entertainment (formerly Rose Video) for VCD and DVD release and also first aired on Channel 5 starting from November 18, 2007, until it ended on October 4, 2008, with all episodes dubbed.
The series was released in Vietnam with a Vietnamese dub by Phuong Nam Film Studio under Magicranger- Chiến binh siêu nhân on VCD and DVD around 2010.

References

External links

 at Super-Sentai.net

Super Sentai
Television about magic
2005 Japanese television series debuts
2006 Japanese television series endings
Genies in television
Japanese supernatural television series
Japanese action television series
Japanese fantasy television series
Television series about families
Television series about siblings
Japanese horror fiction television series
Dark fantasy television series